Schneckloth v. Bustamonte, 412 U.S. 218 (1973), was a U.S. Supreme Court case that ruled that in a case involving a consent search, although knowledge of a right to refuse consent is a factor in determining whether a grant of consent to a search was voluntary, the state does not need to prove that the person who granted consent to search knew of the right to refuse consent under the Fourth Amendment.

Background
While on routine patrol in Sunnyvale, California, at approximately 2:40 in the morning, Officer James Rand stopped an automobile when he observed that one headlight and its license plate light were burned out. Six men were in the vehicle. Joe Alcala and the respondent, Robert Bustamonte, were in the front seat with Joe Gonzales, the driver. Three older men were seated in the rear. In response to the policeman's question, Gonzales could not produce a driver's license, Rand asked if any of the other five had any evidence of identification. Only Alcala produced a license, and he explained that the car was his brother's. After the six occupants had stepped out of the car at the officer's request, after two additional policemen had arrived, Rand asked Alcala if he could search the car. Alcala replied, "Sure, go ahead." Prior to the search, no one was threatened with arrest, and, according to Rand's uncontradicted testimony, it "was all very congenial at this time." Gonzales testified that Alcala actually helped in the search of the car by opening the trunk and glove compartment. In Gonzales' words:
"[T]he police officer asked Joe [Alcala], he goes, 'Does the trunk open?' And Joe said, 'Yes.' He went to the car and got the keys and opened up the trunk."
Wadded up under the left rear seat, the police officers found three checks that had previously been stolen from a car wash. The checks were later linked to Bustamonte (defendant), one of the six passengers riding in the car.
The trial judge denied Bustamonte’s motion to suppress, and the checks in question were admitted in evidence at Bustamonte's trial.

Holding
The court held that consent searches are constitutional, and the government must show that consent existed. However, a defendant under the Fourth Amendment need not necessarily know of his right to object to a consent search. That differentiates the case from Miranda v. Arizona in which the Court held that defendants must know of their rights against self-incrimination in the course of a custodial interrogation.

References

External links
 

1973 in United States case law
United States Fourth Amendment case law
United States Supreme Court cases of the Burger Court
United States Supreme Court cases